Spring Gully is an unincorporated community in Williamsburg County, in the U.S. state of South Carolina.

History
The community descriptively was named for the fact that a spring flowed in a nearby gully.

Notable person
Chubby Checker, a rock and roll singer, was born in Spring Gully in 1941.

References

Unincorporated communities in Georgetown County, South Carolina
Unincorporated communities in South Carolina